Events from the year 1921 in Japan.

Incumbents
Emperor: Taishō
Regent: Hirohito (from November 25)
Prime Minister:
Hara Takashi (until November 4)
Takahashi Korekiyo (from November 13)

Governors
Aichi Prefecture: Shunji Miyao (until 18 April); Hikoji Kawaguchi (starting 18 April)
Akita Prefecture: Ryoshin Nao 
Aomori Prefecture: 
 until 9 March: Hidehiko Michioka 
 9 March-28 September: Shundo Kahei
 starting 28 September: Yujiro Ozaki
Ehime Prefecture: Toshio Mawatari (until 27 May); Juunosuke Miyazaki (starting 27 May)
Fukui Prefecture: Kohei Yuji (until 27 May); Josuke Shiraogawa (starting 27 May)
Fukuoka Prefecture: Yasukouchi Asakichi 
Fukushima Prefecture: Miyata Mitsuo
Gifu Prefecture: Kanokogi Kogoro (until 27 May); Manpei Ueda (starting 27 May)
Gunma Prefecture: Muneyoshi Oshiba 
Hiroshima Prefecture: Raizo Wakabayashi (until 19 July); Ichiro Yoda (starting 19 July)
Ibaraki Prefecture: Yuichiro Chikaraishi (until 27 May); Genjiro Moriya (starting 27 May)
Iwate Prefecture: Takeo Kakinuma 
Kagawa Prefecture: Yoshibumi Satake 
Kochi Prefecture: Abe Yoshihiko 
Kumamoto Prefecture: Hikoji Kawaguchi (until 27 May); Sansuke Nakayama (starting 27 May)
Kyoto Prefecture: Eitaro Mabuchi (until July); Raizo Wakabayashi (starting July)
Mie Prefecture: Haruki Yamawaki 
Miyagi Prefecture: Mori Masataka (until 27 May); Yuichiro Chikaraishi (starting 27 May)
Miyazaki Prefecture: Naomiki Hirose (until 3 July); Goro Sugiyama (starting 3 July)
Nagano Prefecture: Tenta Akaboshi (until 27 May); Tadahiko Okada (starting 27 May)
Niigata Prefecture: Ota Masahiro 
Okayama Prefecture: Masao Kishimoto
Okinawa Prefecture: Sōsuke Kawagoe (until 27 May); Jyun Wada (starting 27 May)
Saga Prefecture: Sawada Ushimaro (until 3 June); Tominaga (starting 3 June)
Saitama Prefecture: Horiuchi Hidetaro 
Shiname Prefecture: Sanehide Takarabe 
Tochigi Prefecture: Hiroyoshi Hiratsuka 
Tokushima Prefecture: Rinpei Otsu (until month unknown)
Tokyo: Hiroshi Abe (until 27 May); Katsuo Usami (starting 27 May)
Toyama Prefecture: Higashizono Motomitsu (until 24 December); Shida Jisho (starting 24 December)
Yamagata Prefecture: Ichiro Yoda (until 19 July); Morimoto Izumi (starting 19 July)
Yamanashi Prefecture: Miki Nagano

Events
January 15 – Mitsubishi Electronics was separate section from Mitsubishi Shipbuildings (now Mitsubishi Heavy Industries) which was founded in Ōsone, Nagoya. 
January Unknown date – Komatsu Limited was founded, as predecessor name was Komatsu Ironworks. 
September – Sempill Mission sent by Britain to Japan, with the objective of helping the Imperial Japanese Navy develop its aeronaval forces.
October 16 – Janome Sewing Machine founded.
November 4 – Prime Minister Hara Takashi is assassinated at Tokyo Station.
November 12 – Washington Naval Conference opens at Memorial Continental Hall Hall in downtown Washington DC.
November 25 – Crown Prince Hirohito is made regent in place of his ailing father.
December 13 – In the Four-Power Treaty on Insular Possessions, Japan, the United States, United Kingdom, and France agree to recognize the status quo in the Pacific.
Termination of Anglo-Japanese Alliance.
Ladies' Agreement
Unknown date – Otsuka Pharmaceutical (大塚製薬) founded in Naruto, Shikoku Island.

Births
January 3 – Natsuko Kahara, actress (d. 1991)
January 26 – Akio Morita, businessman and co-founder of Sony Corporation (d. 1999)
February 9 – Junzo Shono, writer (d. 2009)
February 11 – Edward Seidensticker, scholar, historian, and translator (d. 2007)
February 14 – Toshiko Taira, textile artist (d. 2022)
March 19 – Heitaro Nakajima, engineer (d. 2017)
April 20 – Michiko Inukai, writer and philanthropist (d. 2017)
December 20 – Kosuke Gomi, novelist (d. 1980)

Deaths
January 13 – Ijuin Gorō, admiral (b. 1852)
June 19 – Nabeshima Naohiro, politician and former daimyō (b. 1846)
September 28 – Yasuda Zenjirō, entrepreneur, founder of the Yasuda zaibatsu (b. 1838)
November 4 – Hara Takashi, Prime Minister of Japan (b. 1856)
November 5 – Yusuke Hashiba, archaeologist, historian and anthropologist (b. 1851)
December 29 – Hayashi Yūzō, politician (b. 1842)

See also
List of Japanese films of the 1920s

References

 
1920s in Japan
Years of the 20th century in Japan